
Ciechanów County is a unit of territorial administration and local government (powiat) in Masovian Voivodeship, east-central Poland. It came into being on January 1, 1999, as a result of the Polish local government reforms passed in 1998.

As of 2019 its total population is 89,460, out of which the population of Ciechanów is 44,118, that of Glinojeck is 3,019, and the rural population is 42,323.

Neighbouring counties
Ciechanów County is bordered by Mława County to the north, Przasnysz County to the north-east, Maków County and Pułtusk County to the east, and Płońsk County to the south.

Administrative division
The county is subdivided into nine gminas (one urban, one urban-rural and seven rural). These are listed in the following table, in descending order of population.

References

External links
 Website of Ciechanow City

 
Land counties of Masovian Voivodeship